Nugatti is a Norwegian brand of chocolate spread made from hazelnuts and nougat. It comes in ordinary or economy-sized plastic tubs, or the latest addition, a small red tube, similar to toothpaste tubes, and is produced by Stabburet.

It was introduced for sale in Finland in the autumn of 2020.

Types
There are 8 different types of Nugatti.

 Nugatti The original
 Nugatti Crisp Has small crispy granules added to it
 Nugatti Max Has 33% less sugar than the original
 Nugatti Air Is made by adding air bubbles to the chocolate spread, making it softer and with lighter texture
 Nugatti Krønsjy Has small salty corn chips in it
 Nugatti Melkesjoko Is made with milk chocolate
 Nugatti Salt karamell Has caramel, salt added to it
 Nugatti Twist Is a swirl of milk and white chocolate spread

References

See also
Nutella

Brand name chocolate
Norwegian cuisine
Orkla ASA